Mohamed Hanifa Mohamed Navavi (born 3 August 1946) is a Sri Lankan politician and Member of Parliament.

Navavi was born on 3 August 1946. Navavi was one of the United National Front for Good Governance's (UNFGG) candidates in Puttalam District at the 2015 parliamentary election but failed to get elected. However, after the election he was appointed as a UNFGG National List MP in the Sri Lankan Parliament.

Electoral history

References

1946 births
All Ceylon Makkal Congress politicians
Living people
Members of the 15th Parliament of Sri Lanka
People from North Western Province, Sri Lanka
Sri Lankan Moor politicians
Sri Lankan Muslims